"Come Home" is a song by English rock band James, first released as a single in November 1989 by Rough Trade. Like the preceding single, "Sit Down", it received little attention initially and led to James parting ways with Rough Trade. After Mercury Records had signed the band to the Fontana label and experienced chart success with "How Was It for You" they re-released "Come Home" on 25 June 1990 in a version remixed by Flood.

The original release had artwork by Central Station Design while the re-release repeated the design of the "How Was It for You" singles, with the words "come" and "home" on the front and back covers, respectively, with different background colours marking the various formats.
The song featured on the influential 1990 'Madchester' compilation album Happy Daze.

Track listings

1989 release
7" vinyl
 UK: Rough Trade / RT245

12" vinyl
 UK: Rough Trade / RTT245

CD
 UK: Rough Trade / RTT245CD

1990 release
7" vinyl and cassette
UK: Fontana / JIM6 (7" vinyl), JIMMC6 (cassette)

12" vinyl
 UK: Fontana / JIM612 (purple cover)

 UK: Fontana / JIMM612 (green cover)

CD
 UK: Fontana / JIMCD6

Chart performance

References

James (band) songs
1989 singles
1990 singles
Rough Trade Records singles
Fontana Records singles
1989 songs

ro:Come Home